Nightmare is a Japanese visual kei rock band formed in January 2000. they have released eleven studio albums, four compilation albums and twenty-eight singles. Most of their albums and singles have been released in three formats—two with bonus DVDs and one CD only (often with bonus tracks).

Studio albums

Live albums

Compilation albums

Video albums

Singles

Music videos

Jishou (Shounen Terrorist)
Gianizm Tsuu (Shougai Minagoroshi)
Believe
Akane
Hate
Varuna
Tokyo Shounen
Tsuki no Hikari, Utsutsu no Yume
Sekishoku
Shian
Jibun no Hana
Dasei Boogie
Яaven Loud Speeeaker
Nazuki
Jashin to Bara
LivEvil
Mary
The World 
Alumina
Criminal Baby
Gianizm Shichi
Dirty
Moebius no Yuutsu
Raison D'Etre
Konoha
Cloudy Dayz
White Room
The Last Show
Lost in Blue
Kaikou Catharsis 
Naked Love
Mad Black Machine
Melody
Can you do it?
Gianizm Shi 
Gianizm Ten
Rem_ 
Love Addict
Vermilion.
ByeBye
A:Fantasia
Romeo
Swallowtail
Ray of Light
Sleeper
Star Spangled Breaker
mimic
Paranoid
Deus ex Machina
Ugly Duck's Will
ASSaulter
Owaru Sekai no Hajimari wa Kinari
Dizzy
I'm high roller
Rewrite
Isolation
Gallows
Drastica
TABOO
Aizou Rondo
Blur
Buddies

Demotapes & Mini albums

Demos
"" (2001)
""
"5 + 1 = ?" (2001)
"" (April 2001)
"Untitled" (July 13, 2001)
"" (August 15, 2001)
"" (December 25, 2001)

Mini albums

Release Date: November 21, 2002
Oricon Peak Position: #113

Omnibus appearances

References

Rock music group discographies
Discographies of Japanese artists